The UK Global Health Insurance Card (GHIC) is a card issued by the NHS Business Services Authority on behalf of the Department for Work and Pensions in the United Kingdom. It is issued free of charge to anyone covered by the social security system of the United Kingdom and provides evidence of entitlement to the provision of healthcare services under the UK's reciprocal healthcare agreements with the European Union, Switzerland and the Bailiwick of Guernsey. It is also accepted by Australia as proof of eligibility to enrol in Medicare.

Before January 2021, UK residents, students and European Economic Area/Switzerland-resident UK state pension recipients were entitled to a European Health Insurance Card. Under the terms of the EU–UK Trade and Cooperation Agreement, the UK and EU agreed that reciprocal healthcare provision would continue. The UK launched the Global Health Insurance Card in January 2021 to partially replace the EHIC for this purpose. The UK continues to accept the EU's EHIC and issue EHIC cards to certain individuals who maintain entitlement under previous treaties with the EEA and Switzerland.

Despite its name, it is valid in fewer countries than the EHIC. Because similar reciprocal healthcare agreements have not yet been formed between the UK and all EEA states, the GHIC is not currently valid in Norway, Iceland, or Liechtenstein. However, the UK is currently negotiating arrangements with these countries, and British citizens can continue to receive reciprocal care in Norway with only their passport.

Like the EHIC, the GHIC only covers healthcare which is normally covered by a statutory health care system in the visited country, so the UK government still advises travellers to purchase travel insurance.

History

Background
The UK and European Union have a long history of reciprocal healthcare agreements. The UK's National Health Service was one of the first universal healthcare systems established anywhere in the world, influencing British dominions such as Australia who then formed reciprocal agreements for their citizens to receive treatment. The European Economic Community (EEC) also agreed in 1971 that members should provide social security services including healthcare to each other's residents, and the UK joined the EEC in 1973.

Entitlement to healthcare in the EEC and later EU is based on residence rather than citizenship, so a passport or national identity card is not sufficient evidence to prove entitlement to reciprocal care. For this reason, the European Commission made the decision in 2003 to create the European Health Insurance Card. As an EU member state, the UK issued this card to all entitled persons between 2004 and 2020. However, in 2020, the UK withdrew from the European Union, meaning that reciprocal healthcare elements of the EU and associated treaties with the EEA and Switzerland ceased to apply to the UK. Initial withdrawal agreements with those respective parties included some provision to continue to recognise EHIC cards for individuals with an entitlement pre-dating the UK's withdrawal from the European Single Market.

Establishment and later expansion
In December 2020, the UK and EU concluded the EU–UK Trade and Cooperation Agreement, which allowed for continued healthcare reciprocity and acceptance of EU-issued EHIC cards. The UK opted to begin issuing its own card as evidence for individuals covered by the UK system. The intention is that this new "Global Health Insurance Card" will ultimately be used not only for European reciprocal care, but also reciprocal care agreements with other countries that the UK signs treaties with.

In September 2021, an agreement was reached in principle on social security coordination with Switzerland, which includes re-establishment of reciprocal healthcare recognising the GHIC scheme. This came in to effect in 2022. This was the first non-EU country and first EFTA member to which GHIC validity was expanded.

Appearance

The appearance of the UK Global Health Insurance Card is derived from the previously issued European Health Insurance Card to facilitate ease of acceptance within the EU. All EHIC fields used on the UK-issued EHIC have been carried over in the same format, however the field numbering system of the EHIC common model have been removed. Fields include:
Name (family names)
Given names
Date of birth
Personal identification number (a number that remains consistent across all UK EHICs and GHICs issued to an individual)
Identification number of the issuing institution (usually 0001 for the Department for Work and Pensions)
Identification number of the card (a number unique to each GHIC issued)

The background of the card consists of a Union Flag design and a hologram, showing an image of the Union Flag and the Staff of Asclepius, is fixed on the upper right corner. Where the applicant lives in Northern Ireland, a more neutral design can optionally be issued with a plain background, more closely resembling the previous EHIC.

A provisional paper GHIC can also be issued by the UK in urgent circumstances provided that it is signed and sealed by a relevant UK government institution.

Eligibility

Eligibility for the GHIC
Those eligible for a GHIC include:

British and Irish citizens habitually resident in the UK;
All other citizens resident in the UK with valid leave to remain;
Recipients of a UK state pension living in the EU or Switzerland;
Students normally resident in the UK but currently undertaking study or a work placement in the EU or Switzerland;
Workers normally resident in the UK but temporarily posted abroad by their employer.

Anyone with a currently valid UK-issued EHIC does not need to apply for a GHIC until it expires.

Eligibility for a UK-issued EHIC
Those who remain eligible for a UK-issued EHIC include:
EU, Swiss, Norwegian, Icelandic or Liechtenstein citizens living in the UK since before 1 January 2021 (and their dependents);
Recipients of a UK state pension living in the EU registered on form S1 or E121 (and their dependents);
Frontier workers working across the UK border since before 1 January 2021 and registered on form S1 or E106 (and their dependents);
Workers normally resident in the UK but temporarily posted abroad by their employer in the EU, Switzerland, Norway, Iceland or Liechtenstein since before 1 January 2021 (and their dependents);
Students normally resident in the UK but currently undertaking study or a work placement in the EU, Switzerland, Norway, Iceland or Liechtenstein since before 1 January 2021.

Acceptance and validity
The eligibility rules for each of these agreements may differ from GHIC eligibility, and the scope of treatment offered may also differ from that in the UK-EU GHIC agreement. However, these countries now accept the GHIC as evidence of entitlement to their respective bilateral scheme:

 - Came into effect in 2022.

 - GHIC and UK EHIC is accepted when presented with a British or Irish passport or a valid UK residence visa. The bearer is eligible to enrol in Medicare.
 Bailiwick of Guernsey - Came into effect in 2023.

The UK also has reciprocal healthcare agreements with Australia, Bosnia and Herzegovina, Kosovo, North Macedonia, New Zealand, Serbia, the British Crown Dependencies of the Isle of Man and Jersey and the British Overseas Territories of Anguilla, the British Virgin Islands, the Falkland Islands, Gibraltar, Montserrat, Saint Helena and the Turks and Caicos Islands. However, GHIC has not been acknowledged as legal verification for reciprocal healthcare under these agreements.

See also

EU–UK Trade and Cooperation Agreement
European Health Insurance Card

Notes

References

Universal health care
Health insurance cards
Health and the European Union
Brexit replacement schemes
Department for Work and Pensions